Carlos Alberto Ospina Hernández (born 10 September 1982 in Nechí) is a Colombian former professional cyclist.

Major results

2008
 3rd Overall Cinturón a Mallorca
2009
 1st Prologue (TTT) Vuelta a Colombia
2010
 1st  Time trial, National Road Championships
2011
 2nd Road race, National Road Championships
2013
 1st  Time trial, National Road Championships
2014
 3rd Tobago Cycling Classic

References

External links

1982 births
Living people
Colombian male cyclists
South American Games bronze medalists for Argentina
South American Games medalists in cycling
Competitors at the 2010 South American Games
Sportspeople from Antioquia Department
Competitors at the 2010 Central American and Caribbean Games
21st-century Colombian people